Memorias del ángel caído is a 1997 Spanish thriller film with horror and fantasy elements written and directed by Fernando Cámara and David Alonso. It stars Santiago Ramos as a clergyman suffering a crisis of faith, alongside José Luis López Vázquez, Emilio Gutiérrez-Caba, Asunción Balaguer, Tristán Ulloa, Héctor Alterio, and Juan Echanove.

Plot 
In a parish church located in a neighborhood of Madrid, the faithful attending to the Holy Communion die on the spot. Upon the initial police inquiries pertaining the criminal investigation, the priests living in the parish react differently: Vicente speaks of a miracle, Julio is more reticent, while Francisco experiences a crisis of faith and a depressive state that plunges him into a series of terrifying visions. The deceased acolytes "resurrect" three days later and the police reveals that they had been poisoned by a drug. A violent death ends up bringing to light an ancient millenarian prophecy intending to create a new Christianity and whose dangerous leader is closer than it seemed.

Cast

Production 
The screenplay was penned by David  Alonso and Fernando Cámara.  worked as a cinematographer whereas Javier Cámara was responsible for the score. The film is a Lotus Film Internacional production.

Release 
Selected for the 30th Sitges Film Festival's competitive slate, the film was presented in October 1997. It was theatrically released in Spain on 17 October 1997.

Accolades 

|-
| align = "center" | 1998 || 12th Goya Awards || Best New Director || David Alonso, Fernando Cámara ||  || align = "center" | 
|}

See also 
 List of Spanish films of 1997

References

Bibliography 
 

Films set in Madrid
1990s Spanish films
1990s Spanish-language films
Spanish mystery thriller films
Spanish dark fantasy films
Spanish supernatural horror films
Religious horror films
Films shot in Madrid
1997 directorial debut films
Occult detective fiction